Tim Lane (born 24 November 1959, in Coonabarabran, New South Wales) is an Australian rugby union coach and former player.

Playing career
Lane played either in the centres or at fly-half. He represented Queensland from 1981 to 1987, and also won three caps for the Wallabies in 1985.

Coaching career
He started his coaching career at the Manly club in Sydney where in one season took them to an undefeated premiership. In 1998 he took on the job of an assistant coach for the Wallabies,
coaching the back-line during which time the team won the Bledisloe Cup and Tri- Nations and the 1999 Rugby World Cup in Wales. In 2000 he took over coaching at Clermont Ferrand in France where he took the club to the final in his first season.

At the end of the 2000-01 French season he joined the Springboks as an assistant coach for the back-line. Following coaching appointments with the Cats, the Italian national side, the Ricoh Black Rams and CA Brive he joined Toulon in January 2007 for the remainder of the 2006/07 season as general manager and backs coach. He was successful in helping the club in its bid for promotion to the Top 14.

Lane was appointed head coach of the Georgia national rugby union team in February 2008. Despite achieving good results, he was controversially sacked from the Georgian job in 2010. He then returned to Australia and took up the head coaching position again at Manly for the 2011 Shute Shield season.

Lane was appointed as head coach of Lyon OU in 2013, winning the Rugby Pro D2 title with the club and gaining promotion to the French Top 14. However, with six rounds remaining in the 2014–15 season, he was sacked by Lyon with a 7–13 win–loss record at the club.

References

1959 births
Living people
Australian rugby union players
Australian rugby union coaches
Australia international rugby union players
Rugby union players from New South Wales
Rugby union centres
Rugby union fly-halves
Georgia national rugby union team coaches